Jacobus Francois Venter (born 19 April 1991) is a South African rugby union player. He usually plays as an inside-centre.

Club career

In July 2013, it was announced that he would join the  prior to the 2014 Super Rugby season on a two-year deal.

In March 2018, it was announced that Venter would join English Premiership side Worcester Warriors on a two-year contract from the 2018–19 season. On 5 October 2022 all Worcester players had their contacts terminated due to the liquidation of the company to which they were contracted.

Venter signed for the Sharks following Worcester’s liquidation.

International career
He was a member of the South Africa Under 20 team that competed in the 2010 and 2011 IRB Junior World Championships.

In 2016, Venter was included in a South Africa 'A' squad that played a two-match series against a touring England Saxons team. He was named in the starting line-up for their first match in Bloemfontein, but ended on the losing side as the visitors ran out 32–24 winners. He also started the second match of the series, scoring a try five minutes into the second half of a 26–29 defeat to the Saxons in George.

References

External links

Bulls profile
itsrugby.co.uk profile

Living people
1991 births
South African rugby union players
Rugby union centres
Bulls (rugby union) players
Blue Bulls players
Cheetahs (rugby union) players
Afrikaner people
Rugby union players from Bloemfontein
Alumni of Grey College, Bloemfontein
South Africa Under-20 international rugby union players
South Africa international rugby union players
Free State Cheetahs players
Worcester Warriors players
Sharks (rugby union) players
Sharks (Currie Cup) players